Rörsjöstaden (Pipelake Town) is a neighbourhood of Malmö, situated in the Borough of Centrum, Malmö Municipality, Skåne County, Sweden. Värnhemstorget as well as St. Paul's Church are located in Rörsjöstaden.

References

Neighbourhoods of Malmö